Calathea chimboracensis is a species of plant in the Marantaceae family. It is endemic to Ecuador.  Its natural habitats are subtropical or tropical moist lowland forests and subtropical or tropical moist montane forests.

References

chimboracensis
Endemic flora of Ecuador
Endangered plants
Taxonomy articles created by Polbot